Twisted City is a novel written by Jason Starr and published by Vintage Crime/Black Lizard in July 2004, which later went on to win the Anthony Award for Best Paperback Original in 2005.

References 

Anthony Award-winning works
American mystery novels
2004 novels